Blanche Henrietta Johnes Shelley Pechell (15 December 1835 – ) was a British photographer and writer.

Blanche Henrietta Johnes Shelley was the daughter of Sir John Villiers Shelley, 7th Baronet and Louisa Elizabeth Anne Knight. She was a distant relative of photographic pioneer Henry Fox Talbot and her family became involved in early experiments with photography.  Her only surviving photograph, Ferns and Daffodil, dates from 1854.

She married genealogist Hervey Charles Pechell in 1874.

In 1876, she published a children's story called Fernseed; or, The Woodland Fairy.

She inherited Maresfield Park from her father, and Hervey Pechell, who died a year after her, bequeathed it to Count Alexander Münster.

References 

Created via preloaddraft
1835 births
1898 deaths
British women photographers
British women writers
Daughters of baronets
Blanche